Irina Polechtchouk (born 1 August 1973) is a Belarusian-French volleyball player, a member of the Belarus women's national volleyball team. By playing in France for a long time she obtained French citizenship.

Sporting achievements

Clubs 
Belarusian Championship:
  2004
CEV Cup:
  2008
  1995
French Championship:
  2007, 2009, 2010, 2011
  2000, 2001, 2002, 2003, 2006
  1995, 1996, 1998, 2005
French Cup:
  2002, 2007, 2009, 2010, 2011
Top Teams Cup:
  2003
CEV Women's Champions League:
  2010

National Team 
FIVB Women's U20 World Championship:
  1991
Women's Junior European Championship:
  1992

References

External links
 Irina Polechtchouk at Volleybox.net
 

1973 births
Living people
Belarusian women's volleyball players
French women's volleyball players
Naturalized citizens of France
Sportspeople from Minsk